The National Council of Ministers of the Babangida administration was inaugurated in September 1985 and was made up of a mixture of civilian and serving and former military officers. But towards the end of the administration in January 1993, a transitional council made up of civilian cabinet members with the official titles of secretary was inaugurated.

References

Government of Nigeria